Cat eye syndrome critical region protein 1 is a protein that in humans is encoded by the CECR1 gene.

This gene encodes a member of a subfamily of the adenosine deaminase protein family. The encoded protein may act as a growth factor and have adenosine deaminase activity. It may be responsible for some of the phenotypic features associated with cat eye syndrome. Two transcript variants encoding distinct isoforms have been identified for this gene.

References

External links

Further reading